Abdolabad (also Romanized as ‘Abdolābād; also known as ‘Abdolābād-e Bādīz and Abdol Abad Siloo’eyeh) is a village in Jorjafak Rural District, in the Central District of Zarand County, Kerman Province, Iran. At the 2006 census, its population was 95, in 36 families.

References 

Populated places in Zarand County